Summer Days, Summer Nights (originally titled Summertime) is a 2018 American comedy-drama film, written, directed, and produced by Edward Burns. It stars Pico Alexander, Burns, Zoe Levin, Susan Misner, Lindsey Morgan, Anthony Ramos, Jon Rudnitsky, Amadeus Serafini, Caitlin Stasey and Rita Volk.

It had its world premiere at the Tribeca Film Festival on April 27, 2018. It was released on August 24, 2021, by American International Pictures.

Cast
 Pico Alexander as JJ Flynn
 Edward Burns as Jack Flynn
 Zoe Levin as Lydia
 Susan Misner as Claudia Mckenna
 Lindsey Morgan as Debbie Espinoza
 Anthony Ramos as Frankie
 Jon Rudnitsky as Mello
 Amadeus Serafini as Terry
 Caitlin Stasey as Suzy Denner
 Rita Volk as Winky 
 Carly Brooke as Pam

Production
In May 2017, Rita Volk, Caitlin Stasey, Lindsey Morgan and Zoe Levin joined the cast of the film, with Edward Burns directing and producing from a screenplay he wrote. In June 2017, Pico Alexander, Amadeus Serafini, Jon Rudnitsky, Carly Brooke and Anthony Ramos were announced to star in the film.

Release
The film had its world premiere at the Tribeca Film Festival on April 27, 2018. It was released on August 24, 2021, by American International Pictures.

References

External links
 

2018 films
2018 comedy-drama films
American comedy-drama films
American International Pictures films
2010s English-language films
2010s American films